Burckella sorei is a species of plant in the family Sapotaceae. It is found in Papua New Guinea and the Solomon Islands. It is threatened by habitat loss.

References

sorei
Near threatened plants
Taxonomy articles created by Polbot